The 1970–71 Norwegian 1. Divisjon season was the 32nd season of ice hockey in Norway. Eight teams participated in the league, and Valerenga Ishockey won the championship.

Regular season

External links 
 Norwegian Ice Hockey Federation

Nor
GET-ligaen seasons
1970 in Norwegian sport
1971 in Norwegian sport